ZAON Kifissia is a Greek multisport club based in Kifissia, a suburb of Athens. It was founded in 1962. The full name of the club is Zirineios Athlitikos Omilos Neon. The club has departments in several sports. The most successful department is the volleyball women team that has won Greek championships and cups. Concretely, the women volleyball team has won five Greek Championships and one Greek Cup. In current season ZAON women volleyball team plays in A2 Ethniki (second division). Seat of the club is the Zirineion gymnasium in Kifissia. The club's colours are red and white.

Departments

Women Volleyball
Women Basketball
Gymnastics
Swimming

Honours
Women's volleyball team
 Greek Championship
 Winners (5):  1974, 1975, 1976, 1980, 1981 Greek Cup Winners (1): 2002

References

External links
 Official Webpage

Multi-sport clubs in Attica
Greek volleyball clubs
Sports clubs established in 1962
1962 establishments in Greece